Chuave Rural LLG is a local-level government (LLG) of Chimbu Province, Papua New Guinea. The Chuave language is spoken in the LLG.

Wards
01. Sirikoge
02. Emegi
03. Membimangi
04. Togoma
05. Agugu
06. Kautambandi
07. Maimagu
08. Goi
09. Mainamo
10. Keu No. 1
11. Keu No. 2
12. Onoma
13. Eigun
82. Chuave Urban

References

Local-level governments of Chimbu Province